The Scottish Professional Football League (SPFL) is the national men's association football league in Scotland. The league was formed in June 2013 following a merger between the Scottish Premier League and the Scottish Football League. As well as operating its league competition, which consists of the top four levels of the Scottish football league system, the SPFL also operates two domestic cup competitions, the Scottish League Cup and the Scottish Challenge Cup. While the Scottish Cup includes all the teams within the SPFL, the competition is run and organised by the Scottish Football Association.

Background
A Scottish football league system was first created in 1890, when the Scottish Football League (SFL) was formed. Traditionally the league had a two divisional structure (Divisions One and Two) between which clubs were promoted and relegated at the end of each season. By the mid-1970s, this organisation was perceived to be stagnant, and it was decided to split into a three divisional structure: Premier Division (formerly Division One), First Division (formerly Division Two) and a newly added Second Division. This system came into force for the 1975–76 season. This setup continued until the 1994–95 season when a four divisional structure was introduced, along with a new Third Division, with all four divisions consisting of ten clubs.

On 8 September 1997, the Premier Division clubs decided to split from the Scottish Football League and form the Scottish Premier League (SPL), following the example of the English Premier League. This decision was fuelled by a desire by the top clubs in Scotland to control more of the revenue generated by the game and to negotiate its contracts with sponsors and broadcasters. SFL revenues had been divided proportionally between clubs in all four divisions. The SPL clubs retained all of its commercial revenues, except for an annual payment to the SFL and a parachute payment to any relegated clubs.

Scottish football began to think about changing its structures again in the late 2000s, as Scottish clubs and national teams were struggling in international competition and revenues were being greatly outgrown by the neighbouring English Premier League. A review, led by former First Minister of Scotland Henry McLeish, was conducted by the Scottish Football Association and its report was published in December 2010. McLeish recommended that Scottish football should have a single league body and that the top flight should be reduced to 10 clubs. The proposal to change the top flight numbers did not proceed because of opposition from four SPL clubs, with only two needed to block any change of that nature.

Talks continued about the proposed league merger. A proposal for a merged league body with a 12–12–18 structure was advanced in April 2013. This plan failed when two SPL clubs (Ross County and St Mirren) voted against. The SPL clubs unanimously agreed a revised merger plan a few weeks later, which would retain the same league structure and redistribute more revenues to second tier clubs. The SFL submitted a counter-proposal allowing for more revenues to be given to third and fourth tier clubs, but this was rejected by the SPL, who stuck with the plan agreed by their clubs. An indicative vote of SFL clubs in May suggested that the SPL plan would be formally rejected. Some of the First Division (second tier) clubs threatened to break away from the SFL and form an "SPL2" (SPL second division). The SPL suggested it would welcome the First Division clubs if they decided to leave the SFL. A formal vote of SFL clubs was taken on 12 June. 23 clubs voted in favour, one more than was needed for the proposal to succeed. The merger was formally agreed on 28 June and football was first played under the new structure in the 2013–14 season.

League and corporate structure
On 24 July 2013 the names of the four SPFL divisions were announced – Scottish Premiership, Scottish Championship, Scottish League One and Scottish League Two. The merger was criticised by Alex Anderson of When Saturday Comes as bringing further uncertainty to Scottish football, holding the belief that the semi-professional clubs in the lower divisions will be put into a future regional structure.

The SPFL is operated as a corporation and is owned by the 42 member clubs. Each club is a shareholder, with each having a vote on issues such as rule changes and contracts. The clubs elect a six-man board of directors to oversee the daily operations of the league. The board of directors in turn appoint a Chief Executive. Neil Doncaster became the SPFL's first Chief Executive in July 2013, after beating David Longmuir to the role. The board of directors is composed of eight members, who are elected at the company's annual general meeting.

Clubs

Listed below are the 42 member clubs of the SPFL for the 2022–23 season.

Scottish Premiership
 Aberdeen 
 Celtic
 Dundee United
 Heart of Midlothian
 Hibernian
 Kilmarnock
 Livingston
 Motherwell
 Rangers
 Ross County
 St Johnstone
 St Mirren

Scottish Championship
 Arbroath
 Ayr United
 Cove Rangers
 Dundee
 Greenock Morton
 Hamilton Academical
 Inverness Caledonian Thistle
 Partick Thistle
 Queen's Park
 Raith Rovers

Scottish League One
 Airdrieonians
 Alloa Athletic
 Clyde
 Dunfermline Athletic
 FC Edinburgh
 Falkirk
 Kelty Hearts
 Montrose
 Peterhead
 Queen of the South

Scottish League Two
 Albion Rovers
 Annan Athletic
 Bonnyrigg Rose Athletic
 Dumbarton
 East Fife
 Elgin City
 Forfar Athletic
 Stenhousemuir
 Stirling Albion
 Stranraer

Champions

Promotion/relegation play-off winners
The SPFL retained the promotion/relegation play-off format between Scottish Football League divisions introduced in 2005, whilst adding a play-off tournament to the Premiership, then later a play-off between League Two and the Highland Football League and Lowland Football League in the 2014–15 season. Clubs in bold are those who were promoted from the lower to the higher tier.

H Club promoted from the Highland Football League
L Club promoted from the Lowland Football League

League sponsorship and media rights

One of the reasons given for the merger was the belief that it would help to attract title sponsorship to Scottish league football; contracts between the SPL and Clydesdale Bank and the SFL and Irn-Bru expired in 2013. In October 2013, the SPFL announced a partnership with Irn-Bru, making it the league's official soft drink. Neil Doncaster stated that the SPFL would continue to seek sponsorship for the league and the Scottish League Cup. After two seasons without a main sponsor, a two-year agreement was reached with bookmaker Ladbrokes in May 2015. This was later extended until June 2020. After a year without a title sponsor, the SPFL reached a five-year deal with used car marketplace company Cinch.

The SPFL inherited media rights arrangements with Sky Sports and BT Sport. It emerged in May 2014 that the SPFL had repaid part of the agreed contract due to the additional costs incurred by the broadcasters in covering Rangers matches at lower division grounds. In September 2015, the SPFL announced that it had extended its agreements with Sky and BT to the end of the 2019–20 season on "improved terms". In 2018, it was announced that Sky Sports would take over exclusive live rights for the Premiership from the 2020–21 season.

On 2 November 2013 the SPFL agreed a £20 million deal with sports media rights firm MP & Silva to show games internationally, but this agreement was rescinded in August 2018 when MP & Silva defaulted on its payments.

Women's football
In February 2022, a majority of clubs in the Scottish Women's Premier League (SWPL) voted to accept an offer from the SPFL to run their competitions. The SWPL had previously been operated by Scottish Women's Football.

Notes

References

External links
Official website
 (SPFL Official Twitter account)

 

2013 establishments in Scotland
2
Sports leagues established in 2013
Professional sports leagues in Scotland